Andrew (or Andy) Thompson may refer to:

Sportspeople
Andrew Thompson (catcher) (1846–?), Major League Baseball player for the 1875 Washington Nationals
Andrew Thompson (footballer) (born 1972), Australian rules footballer
Andrew Thompson (manager) (1845–1895), Major League Baseball manager for the 1884 St. Paul Saints
Andrew Thompson (racing driver) (born 1987), Australian racing driver
Andy Thompson (baseball) (born 1975), former Major League Baseball left fielder
Andy Thompson (footballer, born in Sunderland) (fl. 1904–05), English football winger for Sunderland
Andy Thompson (footballer, born 1899) (1899–1970), English footballer
Andy Thompson (footballer, born 1967), English footballer
Andrew Thompson (British racing driver) (active 2003–2004); see Hitech Racing

Others
Andrew Thompson (convict, magistrate) ( 1773–1810), Australian convict and settler
Andrew Thompson (historian) (born 1968), British historian specialising in modern empire
Andrew Thompson (parasitologist), Australian parasitologist
Andrew Thompson (politician) (1884–1961), Australian politician
Andrew Green Thompson (1820–1889), British politician
Andrew Thorburn Thompson (1870–1939), military officer, editor, lawyer and a third-generation political figure in Canada
Andy Thompson (Canadian politician) (1924–2016), Canadian politician
Andy Thompson (Ohio politician) (1963–2020), American politician
Andy Thompson (theatre professional) (born 1970), Canadian entertainer

See also
Andrew Thomson (disambiguation)
Andy Thomson (disambiguation)